B. Vasantha (born 29 March 1944) is a South Indian playback singer. She has received two state level awards, the Kalaimamani (Tamil Nadu) and the Ugadi Award (Andhra Pradesh).

Early life
B. Vasantha was born on 1944 March 29 in Machilipatnam, Andhra Pradesh to Smt Boddupalli Kanaka Durga and Shri Boddupalli Ravindranath. Her father was a Musician, Painter and Photographer. She was raised in Guntur along with 5 siblings. She is the eldest of them. She began singing at a very young age.

Career
Vasantha has sung in many Indian languages such as Kannada, Malayalam, Tamil, Telugu, Tulu, Sanskrit and Hindi and has recorded over 4,000 songs. The first Malayalam film she sang for was Muthalali and her first Tamil film was Konchum Kumari. She has sung numerous film songs in Malayalam with K. J. Yesudas. She also sang in Kannada, Hindi and Telugu movies.

Awards
 Kalaimamani (Tamil Nadu) 
 The Ugadi Award (Andhra Pradesh)
 G Devarajan Shakthigada Award

References

External links
 

1944 births
Living people
Malayalam playback singers
People from Machilipatnam
Singers from Andhra Pradesh